The following is a list of royal crowns:

Others
 Heraldic Crown of the Order of Malta (Heraldic royal crown with eight half-arches. Five half-arches its two-dimensional representation)

 Oba's crown (Ritually potent crown composed of steel wires, beadwork and other masonry. Of all of the members of the Yoruba  chieftaincy system of West Africa, only kings are allowed to wear it).

See also

Crown Jewels
Imperial crown
List of monarchies

References

External links
 https://archive.today/20070509104911/http://www.etoile.co.uk/forum/viewtopic.php?t=5136

Crowns (headgear)
Crowns